Heliconia is a town and municipality in Antioquia Department, Colombia.

Climate
Heliconia has a relatively cool tropical rainforest climate (Af). It has heavy rainfall year round.

References

Municipalities of Antioquia Department